Heidelberg American High School was a school operated by the Department of Defense Dependents Schools (DoDDS) located on the premises of Mark Twain Village, a housing area for American military members and their families in Heidelberg, Germany. The school served 9–12 grade students (originally 7–12 until 1976 when Heidelberg Middle School, built for grades 6–8, was built on Patrick Henry Village) and offered a variety of high school courses.

Heidelberg High School graduated its final class in 2013. Since 2017, Julius-Springer-Schule has occupied the old Heidelberg High School building at Mark-Twain-Straße 1.

Media
Heidelberg High School was featured in the 21 July 1947 issue of Life magazine.

Notable alumni
Nina Arianda - actress, graduated from Heidelberg High School in 2002
Frederic J. Brown III – U.S. Army lieutenant general, graduated from Heidelberg High School in 1952
Marc S. Ellenbogen - diplomat, philanthropist, president, Prague Society for International Cooperation, graduated from Heidelberg High School in 1981
Ron George - NFL Linebacker
 Clint Scovel- mathematician, graduated from the Courant Institute of Mathematical Sciences at NYU in 1983 under the direction of Henry McKean
 Rory Ogle - member of the New Mexico House of Representatives
 Norman Schwarzkopf. Commander, Operation Desert Storm attended Heidelberg for a year in 1950. 
 Elizabeth Vargas - ABC news anchor, graduated from Heidelberg High School in 1980 
Eric Zeier - former American football quarterback in the NFL started his career as a freshman at Heidelberg High School, but did not graduate

References

External links 
Heidelberg Lions
Homepage
DoDEA Europe
DoDEA

American international schools in Germany
High schools in Germany
International schools in Baden-Württemberg
Schools in Heidelberg
Department of Defense Education Activity
School buildings completed in 1946
1946 establishments in Germany
Educational institutions established in 1946
2013 disestablishments in Germany
Educational institutions disestablished in 2013
Defunct schools in Germany